Jowhari may refer to:
 Jowhari, Farashband